Madness, Sadness, Gladness is Picture House's third studio album. It was released in 2003.

Track listing
 Breathe
 She
 Pornstar
 Everybody Loves My Girl
 Lonely Like The Sun
 Drink Talking 
 Gifted Child 
 Safe 
 Breaking In 
 Wishing On Stars 
 Keeping Mum (hidden track Of Course It Is)

2003 albums
Picturehouse (band) albums